Sattaiyampudur (also called Pudur) is a town, on the periphery of  Tiruchengode, Namakkal District.

Economy 
The major occupation of the people is textile weaving. Gada, dhotis, towels, bedsheets are some of the town's textile products. Major part of the community belong to the kaikolar community, renowned for weaving.
Sengunthar Tirumana Mahal Sattaiyampudur - The notable and biggest Tirumana Mandabam in Tiruchengode.

Festivals
Arulmigu Muthu Kumaraswamy Temple and Arulmigu Muthu Mariamman Temple festival Celebrated during the Tamil month of Maasi.         
Arulmigu Muthu Muniyappan Temple festival Celebrated during the Tamil month of Aadi.

Mariamman Festival  
 Arulmigu Muthu Kumaraswamy Temple and Arulmigu Muthu Mariamman Temple festival was celebrated after 8 years, in 2017. Later celebrated every 2 years.
Manjalneerattam is a major part of the festival where youth and men splash water with dissolved turmeric, over each other celebrating a good year of weaving. Earlier, folks of the village celebrate the festival dancing around the streets to the drums, which makes it a spectacular event.

References

Cities and towns in Namakkal district